Hollis Township is located in Peoria County, Illinois. As of the 2010 census, its population was 1,881 and it contained 768 housing units. The village of Mapleton is the only incorporated town in the township.

Geography

Demographics

References

External links
 Hollis Township
 US Census
 City-data.com
 Illinois State Archives

Townships in Peoria County, Illinois
Peoria metropolitan area, Illinois
Townships in Illinois